The Stories of Vladimir Nabokov (in some British editions, The Collected Stories) is a posthumous collection of every known short story that Vladimir Nabokov ever wrote, with the exception of "The Enchanter". In the current printing of this work, sixteen stories not previously published in English are translated by the author's son, Dmitri Nabokov. The collection was first published in America by Alfred A. Knopf in 1995.

As initially published, the collection included 65 stories. Nabokov's first collection of short stories, Nabokov's Dozen, contained thirteen total stories, which made for the structure of all of his subsequent collections, four in his lifetime. In the introduction to the collection, Dmitri Nabokov explains that the newly translated stories were to be his father's final collection. The stories are presented in as close to chronological order as they were able to piece together.

Three additional stories were discovered and translated after the first printing of this collection. They were incorporated in later printings of the U.S. paperback edition and in later printings of the hardback and paperback British editions of this work. It's also worth noting that the eighth part of the story "The Potato Elf" was accidentally omitted from the first five printings of the hardcover edition of this book.

List of stories

Editions
Alfred Knopf, New York, 1995 (hardback) 
Vintage, New York, 1996 (paperback) 
Weidenfeld & Nicolson, London, 1996 (hardback) 
Penguin, London, 1997 (paperback) 
Penguin, London, 1999 (paperback) 
Penguin, London, 2001 (paperback)

References

1995 short story collections
Short story collections by Vladimir Nabokov
Books published posthumously
Alfred A. Knopf books